The 2018–19 season was Pyunik's 25th season in the Armenian Premier League.

Season events
On 2 December, during Pyunik's match against Gandzasar Kapan, manager Andrei Talalayev was sent off for insulting the Fourth official. Talalayev was subsequently banned from football until the end of the season, 31 May 2019, on 6 December 2018.
On 9 April, Talalayev left Pyunik by mutual consent, with Aleksandr Tarkhanov being appointed as the new manager on 11 April.

Squad

Transfers

In

Loans in

Out

Released

Friendlies

FNL Cup

Group stage

Knouckout Stages

Competitions

Overall record

Premier League

Results

Table

Armenian Cup

UEFA Europa League

Qualifying rounds

Statistics

Appearances and goals

|-
|colspan="14"|Pyunik-2 players:

|-
|colspan="14"|Players who left Pyunik during the season:

|}

Goal scorers

Clean sheets

Disciplinary Record

References

FC Pyunik seasons
Pyunik
Pyunik